The Democratic Green Party of Rwanda (DGPR; , PVDR; , IRDKI) is a green political party in Rwanda, established in 2009. The party was registered in August 2013, but too late to contest the 2013 parliamentary elections. Its platform emphasizes unity, non-violence, social justice, participatory democracy, and calls for subsidized prices for agricultural produce. It believes that the unalienable rights of the people include "the right to life, liberty, peaceful assembly, expression, worship and the pursuit of happiness", and that these rights are granted by God.

History
The party was established on 14 August 2009, and aimed to contest the 2010 presidential elections. However, it was prevented from registering. The party's vice-president, André Kagwa Rwisereka, was found beheaded during the election campaign. Green Party leaders in the US called on the Obama Administration to support an investigation into his murder and the allegations that it was politically motivated. President Paul Kagame and his ruling Rwanda Patriotic Front (RFP) has close ties to the US.

The party was finally registered in August 2013, but too late to contest the 2013 parliamentary elections.

On 17 December 2016, Frank Habineza was nominated as the party leader and flag bearer for the 2017 presidential elections. By doing this the party abandoned its earlier threat to boycott the election after its demands for electoral reforms were snubbed by the government. Habineza  went on to finish third of the three candidates with just 0.5% of the vote. However, in the parliamentary elections the following year the party entered parliament after winning two seats.

References

External links

Political parties in Rwanda
Political parties established in 2009
2009 establishments in Rwanda
Green parties in Africa
Global Greens member parties